Parornix concussa is a moth of the family Gracillariidae. It is known from Jammu and Kashmir, India.

References

Parornix
Moths of Asia
Moths described in 1933